Adel Abo Hassoon (born July 30, 1970) is a Syrian television actor and voice actor.

Early life
He was born in Beirut, Lebanon and work with Venus Center for Dubbing since 1995 in many of anime and cartoon. He is married to actress Amnah Omar and has three daughter.

Filmography

Television 
Rijal al hasm
ma malakt aimanokm
al faoaris

Dubbing roles 
Slam Dunk – Hanamichi Sakuragi
Baby & Me – Harumi Enoki
Tommy & Oscar – Oscar
Inazuma Eleven – Ryugo Someoka, Kakuma Keita, Kiyama Hiroto, Hijikata Raiden, Hibiki Seigou (Seasons 2 and 3), Kageno Jin (Seasons 2 and 3)
Fist of the North Star – Rei
Pokémon – Meowth (first voice), Seymour
Inuyasha – Inuyasha
One Piece – Usopp, Portgas D. Ace
Detective Conan
The Story of Cinderella – Charles
Fushigi Yûgi – Tamahome
The Looney Tunes Show – Porky Pig (Venus Center dub)
Iron Kid – Buttons
Animaniacs – Dr. Otto Scratchansniff
Digimon Adventure - Gennai (both old (second voice) and young)
Digimon Adventure 02 – Yamato Ishida, Gennai (both old and young)
Naruto – Neji Hyuga, Gaara Ibiki Morino (first voice), Izumo Kamizuki
Rock Lee & His Ninja Pals - Neji Hyuga Gaara
Justice League – Green Lantern
The Scooby-Doo Show - Scooby-Doo (Venus Centre version)
What's New, Scooby-Doo? – Scooby-Doo (Venus Centre version)
Super Robot Monkey Team Hyperforce Go! – Chiro Takashi
A.T.O.M. – Axel Manning
Monster Rancher – General Durahan
Doraemon – Takeshi "Gian" Goda
W.I.T.C.H.
The Fairly OddParents (Classical Arabic version)
Virtua Fighter - Kage-Maru
Captain Tsubasa - Kojirō Hyūga (seasons 3, 4 and 5)
The Sword and the Chess of Death
The Adventures of Tom Sawyer (redub)
Bartok the Magnificent - Zozi
Bomberman B-Daman Bakugaiden
Bomberman B-Daman Bakugaiden V
Les Misérables: Shōjo Cosette - Bahorel
Gormiti - Nick Tripp, Magmion
Scan2Go - Shiro Shibakusa
Team Hot Wheels: The Origin of Awesome! - Brandon
Team Hot Wheels: The Skills to Thrill! - Brandon
Team Hot Wheels: Build the Epic Race! - Brandon
Jewelpet - Dian/Andy Samael
Jewelpet Twinkle☆ - Dian
Vicky the Viking
Super Little Fanta Heroes (Venus Centre version)
Sortie! Machine Robo Rescue
Mr. Nice Guy - Baggio
Hunter × Hunter (1999) – Todo
Hunter × Hunter (2011) – Silva Zoldyck, Bounty Hunter 
Kuroko's Basketball – Taisuke Ōtsubo
Ice Age - Sid (Classical Arabic version)
Ice Age: Dawn of the Dinosaurs - Sid (Classical Arabic version)
Yo-kai Watch - Whisper Illoo Happierre Negatibuzz Count Zapaway
The Powerpuff Girls (Venus dub)
Dragon Ball Z - Raditz, Captain Ginyu
Dragon Ball Z Kai - Raditz, Tien Shinhan, Shenron, Guldo, Porunga
Dragon Ball Super - Gohan, Zuno, Khai, Rumsshi
Super Wings - Jimbo (Venus Centre version)
Heroes of the City - Calamity Crow
Pretty Rhythm - Shou
Inspector Gadget's Field Trip - Inspector Gadget
Cartooning with Blitz - Bruce Blitz

References

External links 
Adel Abo Hassoon at ElCinema

1970 births
Living people
Syrian male television actors
Syrian male voice actors
Male actors from Beirut
Syrian voice directors